Ultras Mostar is a HŠK Zrinjski Mostar supporters' group in Bosnia and Herzegovina. Officially, the Ultras-Zrinjski Fan Club was founded in March 1998, when the Citizens' Associations Act entered into the Registry of Citizens' Associations in the Herzegovina-Neretva Canton, and exists as an unregistered support group since 1994. They are promoting for all sections of the sports club Zrinjski, but they mostly follow its football department. They got their name in 1998, 6 years after Zrinjski's work was restored. They took the name of the fan-based Ultras Movement in European football. The official song of Ultras, fans of HŠK Zrinjski Mostar, is "Gori brate", and they support their club from the grandstand - Stajanje. Colours used by Ultras on transparencies and boards are black, white and red.

History

1992–1994
At the beginning of 1992, the work of HŠK Zrinjski Mostar was restored in Međugorje, and with its renewal, the winding in the town of Neretva slowly arouses and is organized. As early as 1993, the idea of launching a fan group was created in the fans' minds, which would have the goal of organizing cheering at the matches of Zrinjski. In the course of that year, an idea arose, that those fiercest fans of Zrinjski are called Ultras, modeled on fan groups across Europe.

1994
In April 1994, the Initiative Committee of the Fan Club Zrinjski, Ultras, was created, which was aimed at organizing a Fan Assembly within two years. However, because of the war circumstances, what could have been done within two years wasn't done. They played for the matches, and Zrinjski played very friendly games in Imotski and Široki Brijeg.

In 1994, in Mostar, the final match for the champion of the then Croatian Republic of Herzeg-Bosnia in Zrinjski was played at the stadium Zrinjski against the team Mladost Dubint from Široki Brijeg (today's NK Široki Brijeg). In quite an interesting game, fans failed to see a single goal, and the result remained 0:0. At that match, about 5,000 spectators were gathered, and there were around 300 - 400 of the most fervent ones, which were placed on the central western table of the HŠK Zrinjski stadium. In this game, for the first time, a transparency with the Ultras label was placed. This match has remained memorable after the first organized gathering of Ultras at the matches of its beloved club. This game has written a new history of organized cheering in the city of Neretva. A year later, the Ultras are gathering in basketball matches in Zrinjski, and there are frequent departures on the visiting courts also.

1997 and 1998

In 1997, in the Croatian Lodge "Herceg Stjepan Kosača", the first Assembly of the Fan Club was held in Mostar, where more than 400 members of this support group gathered. After that meeting, one of the ultras podium groups was a fan club named Zrinjevci, which was common in all games played by Zrinjski. During this period there are numerous guest appearances throughout Herzegovina, and go to Busovača, Kiseljak, Vitez, Prozor-Rama, Orašje and other cities where the First League of Herzeg-Bosnia was played.

One year later, Zrinjski is trying to compete for the Euro Cups for the first time in the playoffs for the champions of Bosnia and Herzegovina (the Premier League of BiH has not yet existed, and the Croatian League and the Bosniak Clubs were playing in the playoffs at UEFA's prizes ). The nuns were in the group together with the Željezničar and Bosnia from Visoko, and all the matches were played at the Koševo Olympic Stadium in Sarajevo. It can be rightly said that Ultras were the ones who first crossed the then war line with the fanciful features and came to Sarajevo. Approximately 10,000 spectators gathered in the Koševo Stadium, about 50 Ultras, which were more than excellent, but neither their cheering helped Zrinjska to score a victory. Zrinjski was defeated with 2:1, and at that time Zrinjski was played by Blaž Slišković, one of the best players from the former Yugoslavia.

Subgroups and branches

Subgroups
Ultras Harlem
ECP (Executive City Patrol)
Ultras Avenija
Eagles Vatikan
Ultras Centar 2
Ultras Bijelo Polje
WMC (West Mostar Crew)
EŠM (Ekipa Šantićeva Mostar)
CHS (Chicago Street)
OZ (Odani Zrinjskom)
Ultras Splitska
Ekipa Bakijina luka

Ultras Bijeli Brijeg
Ultras Jasenica
Ultras Rodoč
Ultras Smrčenjaci
Ultras Cim
Ultras Ilići
Ultras Raštani
Ultras Rudnik
Ultras Balinovac

References

External links 
KN Ultras Mostar 
HŠK Zrinjski Mostar Official website 

Bosnia and Herzegovina football supporters' associations
HŠK Zrinjski Mostar
Ultras groups